Veto is an unincorporated community in Franklin County, Mississippi, United States.

In 1900, Veto had a population of 45 people.

A post office operated under the name Veto from 1858 to 1914.

Notes

Unincorporated communities in Franklin County, Mississippi
Unincorporated communities in Mississippi